Jordi Bertomeu Orteu (born 15 January 1959) is a Spanish basketball administrator. He is the former President, Chairman, and CEO of Euroleague Basketball, which operates the professional European club competitions the EuroLeague and EuroCup.

Biography
Bertomeu was born on 15 January 1959, in Barcelona, Catalonia, Spain. Bertomeu earned a bachelor's degree in law from the University of Barcelona.

From 1982 to 1994, he worked as the general counsel and general secretary of the ACB (Basketball Clubs Association), the organizing body of the Liga ACB, the top professional league in Spanish basketball. From 1994 to 2000, he worked as the vice president of the ACB. 

In 2000, he was appointed CEO of Euroleague Basketball, which is the organizing body of Europe's premier club basketball competition, the EuroLeague, as well its second-tier competition, the EuroCup. In 2009, EuroLeague Basketball appointed him to the position of chairman of the board, and in 2011, to the position of president. In November 2021 it was confirmed he will leave his position as Euroleague Basketball CEO at the end of the 2021–22 season after six teams in the league voted to dismiss him.

Awards and honors
On November 25, 2008, Lithuania's government gave Bertomeu the Order of the Republic of Lithuania award, for his contribution to the development and promotion of sports in the country.

Personal life
Bertomeu is the father of Marc Bertomeu Goixens, who is a Catalan political scientist.

References

External links
Jordi Bertomeu, Euroleague Basketball President and CEO, press conference
Jordi Bertomeu, President and CEO, Euroleague Basketball

1959 births
Living people
Basketball executives
Businesspeople from Catalonia
EuroCup Basketball
EuroLeague
People from Barcelona
Spanish sports executives and administrators